The Springdale Caldera is a large Early Silurian caldera in west-central Newfoundland, Canada. It is one of the few calderas in Newfoundland that form a large Silurian age volcanic field. Basalt, andesite, rhyolite, pyroclastic rocks, debris flows, breccias and red sandstone are present at the Springdale Caldera.

See also
Volcanism of Canada
Volcanism of Eastern Canada
List of volcanoes in Canada

References

External links
The Springdale Caldera: A Field Guide for the Annual Field Meeting of the Geological Association of Canada, Newfoundland Branch
Discordant Silurian paleolatitudes for central Newfoundland: New paleomagnetic evidence from the Springdale Group
Sulurian Orogeny in the Newfoundland Appalachians
Discordant Sulrian Paleolatitudes
Geology, geochemistry and geochronology of the Springdale Group, an early Silurian Caldera in central Newfoundland

Calderas of Newfoundland and Labrador
Silurian calderas